Rape of Malaya may refer to:

Battle of Malaya
Japanese occupation of Malaya
The US title of the 1956 film version of A Town Like Alice